Tom Ewart (date of birth unknown, died 28 April 1989) was a West Indian cricket umpire. He stood in seven Test matches between 1948 and 1958.

See also
 List of Test cricket umpires

References

Year of birth missing
1989 deaths
Place of birth missing
West Indian Test cricket umpires